Keepers of the Night is a 1949 West German drama film directed by Harald Braun and starring Luise Ullrich, Hans Nielsen and René Deltgen. It was made as a partnership between a Göttingen-based company and one located in Munich. Much of the shooting took place at the Göttingen Studios. The film's sets were designed by the art director Walter Haag.

Cast
 Luise Ullrich as Cornelie
 Hans Nielsen as Pfarrer Johannes Heger
 René Deltgen as Stefan Gorgas
 Dieter Borsche as Kaplan von Imhoff
 Angelika Meissner as Lotte Heger
 Käthe Haack as Oberin von Heiliggeist
 Gertrud Eysoldt as Schwester Jakobe
 Annette Schleiermacher as Helferin
 Nicolas Koline as Karnickelmann
 Herbert Kroll as Bürgermeister
 Hans Hermann Schaufuß
 Marion Gauer
 Peter Paul
 Anne-Marie Hanschke
 Gudrun Rabente
 Claire Reigbert
 Sigrid Becker
 Ingeborg Morawski
 Ilona Lamée
 Gabriele Roden
 Ursula Thiess
 Charlotte Huhn
 Otto Brodowski
 Odo Krohmann
 Maut Mauthe
 Hermann Nehlsen

References

Bibliography
 Bock, Hans-Michael & Bergfelder, Tim. The Concise Cinegraph: Encyclopaedia of German Cinema. Berghahn Books, 2009.

External links 
 

1949 films
1949 drama films
German drama films
West German films
1940s German-language films
Films directed by Harald Braun
German black-and-white films
1940s German films
Films shot at Göttingen Studios